The Swedish heavy metal band Therion recorded several demo albums. The following is a chronology of Therion demos:

Paroxysmal Holocaust (1989)

Paroxysmal Holocaust is the first of Therion's demo albums. The album was released in April 1989 on a cassette, limited to 600 copies.

The album consists of three death metal songs. The song "Bells of Doom" was later included in a 2001 fan-club compilation album named the same as the song, Bells of Doom.

Recording and production

Paroxysmal Holocaust was recorded during March and April 1989 in the little Swedish 8-track studio Sveastrand. Christofer Johnsson, founder and only all-time band member, had mixed opinions of this demo album. On the Therion official website he mentioned the band was excited because it was their first release, although he was very critical to this recording claiming the album "was awful":

Track listing
 Side one
 "Morbid Reality" – 7:33
 "The Return" – 5:47
 Side two
 "Bells of Doom" – 6:18

Personnel
Christofer Johnsson – guitar
Peter Hansson – lead guitar
Oskar Forss – drums
Erik Gustafsson – bass guitar
Matti Kärki – vocals

Beyond the Darkest Veils of Inner Wickedness (1989)

Beyond the Darkest Veils of Inner Wickedness is the title of a Therion's 1989 demo. The album was released in November 1989 on a cassette, limited to 500 copies.

The album consists of three death metal songs. Two of them, "Macabre Declension" and "Paroxysmal Holocaust", were later included in the 2001 official fan-club compilation Bells of Doom. The song "Paroxysmal Holocaust" recorded live in Strömstad, Sweden, 1989 was included in 2006 box-set compilation Celebrators of Becoming.

Recording and production
Beyond the Darkest Veils of Inner Wickedness was recorded and released in the same year (1989) as the band's first demo album Paroxysmal Holocaust. The album was recorded in a Swedish 16-track studio.

Beyond the Darkest... was the first album where Christofer Johnsson, the only band's all-time member and founder of Therion, started to sing, although after recording he was dissatisfied about the produced work and also about the quality of the sound:

Track listing
 "Macabre Declension" (music: Johnsson, Hansson; lyrics: Johnsson) – 7:04
 "Megalomania" (music: Johnsson; lyrics: Gustafsson, Kärki) – 5:01
 "Paroxysmal Holocaust" (music: Johnsson) – 5:52

Personnel
Christofer Johnsson – vocals, guitar
Peter Hansson – guitar
Oskar Forss – drums
Erik Gustafsson – bass guitar
Matti Kärki – lyrics

Time Shall Tell (1990) 

Time Shall Tell is Therion's third and the last demo album. Released on an LP under the House of Kicks record store, the album was supposed to be released with 1000 copies, but the record store bootlegged another 1000 copies.

The album consists of four death metal songs. The lyrical themes are based around violence and death, human rights, and big corporations (references to Coca-Cola and McDonald's). All songs from the album were included in the band's first studio album Of Darkness....

Track listing
 "Time Shall Tell" – 4:56
 "Dark Eternity" – 4:34
 "Asphyxiate with Fear" – 4:30
 "A Suburb to Hell" – 5:04

Personnel
 Therion
 Peter Hansson – lead guitar, rhythm guitar
 Christofer Johnsson – vocals, rhythm guitar, lyrics
 Oskar Forss – drums
 Erik Gustafsson – bass guitar
 Production
 Calle Schewen – cover artwork
 Tomas Skogsberg – producer

References

Notes

External links
 Paroxysmal Holocaust at the official website
 Beyond the Darkest Veils of Inner Wickedness at the official website
 Time Shall Tell at the official website

Demo albums
Therion
Therion Demo Albums